Hollywood Unknowns: A History of Extras, Bit Players, and Stand-Ins is a 2012 English non-fiction book written by Anthony Slide about the relatively unknown actors of cinema of the United States.

References

2012 non-fiction books
English-language books
American non-fiction books
Books about actors
University Press of Mississippi books